Sir David Grant  (born 12 September 1947) is a British academic who was the Vice-Chancellor of Cardiff University in Wales from 2001 to 2012. Following his appointment, Grant oversaw the merger between Cardiff University and the University of Wales College of Medicine, which was completed in 2004, and the award of University Status to Cardiff.

He gained his PhD in Engineering Science from Durham University in 1974.  Prior to his appointment at Cardiff University, Grant worked for the Dowty Group and then became Director of Technology at The General Electric Company (1991–2001).  He was awarded the Mensforth International Gold Medal by the Institution of Electrical Engineers in 1996.

He became a Fellow of the Royal Academy of Engineering in 1997, and was a Vice-President from 2007 to 2012.  He is also a former council member of the Engineering and Physical Sciences Research Council, and was a governing board member of Innovate UK (formerly the Technology Strategy Board).  He served on the board of the Defence Science and Technology Laboratory from 2012 to 2018, and was chair of STEMNET until 2018.

Grant is a non-executive director of Renishaw plc and of IQE, and chair of the National Physical Laboratory.

He was elected an Honorary Fellow of Wolfson College, Cambridge in 2000.

Grant was appointed a CBE in 1997 for his contribution to the UK Foresight Programme, and was knighted in the 2016 Birthday Honours for services to engineering, technology, and skills.

References

1947 births
Living people
People associated with Cardiff University
Fellows of the Royal Academy of Engineering
Fellows of Wolfson College, Cambridge
Commanders of the Order of the British Empire
Fellows of Jesus College, Oxford
Knights Bachelor
Alumni of Durham University Graduate Society